Lost Horizon 2 is a graphic adventure video game developed by Animation Arts and published by Deep Silver for Microsoft Windows, iOS, Android and Nintendo Switch. It is the sequel to Lost Horizon.

Reception

Lost Horizon 2 received "mixed or average" reviews, according to review aggregator Metacritic.

References

External links
 

2015 video games
Android (operating system) games
Deep Silver games
IOS games
Nintendo Switch games
Point-and-click adventure games
Video game sequels
Video games based on Norse mythology
Video games developed in Germany
Video games set in the 1950s
Windows games
Single-player video games